Deirdre Cartwright (born 27 July 1958) is a British guitarist and composer.

Cartwright was a member of Painted Lady, which later became known as Girlschool; she left to form another band, Tour De Force.

In 1983 Cartwright provided the guitar tuition element of the BBC/PBS series Rockschool alongside bass guitarist Henry Thomas and drummer Geoff Nicholls. In 1989, along with Alison Rayner, she started a regular monthly night at the Vortex Jazz Club called Blow The Fuse.

Discography
With ARQ (Alison Rayner Quintet)
 Short Stories   (2019)
 A Magic Life   (2016)
 August   (2014)

As leader
 Emily Remembered  (2011)
 Tune Up Turn On Stretch Out (2008)
 Dr Quantum Leaps (2005)
 Precious Things (2002)
 Play (1996)
 Debut (1994)

With The Guest Stars
The Guest Stars - compilation (2006)
 Live in Berlin (1987)
 Out at Night (1985)
 The Guest Stars (1984)

With Tour de Force
 Nightbeat (1980) EMI Records
 School Rules (1981) 
 Beat the Clock (1982)

References

External links
 Deirdre Cartwright (official site)
 Blow The Fuse

Living people
British television presenters
British women guitarists
Women jazz guitarists
1958 births
British women television presenters